Dragon's Kin is a science fiction novel by the American-Irish author Anne McCaffrey and her son Todd McCaffrey. Published by Del Rey Books in 2003, it is the eighteenth book in the Dragonriders of Pern series and the first with Todd as co-author.

Dragon's Kin may be considered the first of a trilogy by the McCaffreys, preceding Dragon's Fire and Dragon Harper. Primarily the three books feature Kindan as a boy and young man, about 500 years after landing on Pern (500 AL).

Collaboration
Anne McCaffrey created Pern in the novella Weyr Search (1967) when her second child Todd was eleven. In 2001 and 2002 she published her fifteenth Pern novel and second collection of short stories. Dragon's Kin was their first collaborative work.

Todd later recalled that a Del Rey editor in the 1990s "pitched it to me that someone ought to continue Mum's legacy when she was no longer able. At the time I had misgivings and no story ideas".

Previously, as Todd Johnson, he had contributed the chapter "Training and Fighting Dragons" to The Dragonlover's Guide to Pern (1989). Mother and son had also discussed Pern and its setting for years, and she had suggested that he "writes the military science fiction prequels" to the colonization, but that never progressed far.

They co-authored four Pern novels and, as of December 2011, Todd has done three alone. All are set just before and during the "Third Pass", about 500 years after human settlement on Pern and 2000 years before the "Ninth Pass" events chronicled in most of Anne McCaffrey's Pern books.

Plot summary
The story tells how the people of the planet Pern discover the special abilities of the watch-whers or whers, a distant relative of the dragons. Subsequently, these beasts are used in mines to warn miners of gas pockets and also to locate stranded miners, should there be a cave-in.

The story begins some years before the 3rd Pass in Camp Natalon, a mining camp. There, the reader is introduced to a young boy Kindan, whose father owns a watch-wher called Dask. During a mining cave-in, Kindan loses his entire family as well as Dask, and is adopted by the Master Harper Zist, who begins to train him to be both an entertainer and a spy, something that Harpers do. This is how Kindan learns that the camp is divided into two parties, Natalon's and his uncle Tarik's.

Meanwhile, the camp is without a watch-wher and minor accidents keep delaying the work. Despite the protests from Tarik and his group, Natalon decides to trade an entire winter's worth of coal for a chance for Kindan to ask a queen watch-wher for an egg. He succeeds and begins the difficult task of raising a nocturnal animal. As no records exist on how to raise or train the watch-wher, Kindan has no clue but is luckily aided by the mysterious Nuella. Together, they train Kisk and, in the process, learn a great deal about this species. This proves to be vital as, towards the end of the novel, Kisk's abilities will save many lives, including that of the camp leader, Natalon.

Notes

References

Sources

External links

2003 novels
2003 fantasy novels
2003 science fiction novels
Dragonriders of Pern books
Collaborative novels
Novels by Anne McCaffrey
Novels by Todd McCaffrey
Del Rey books